Wargames Illustrated is a magazine dedicated to miniature wargaming which is focused on historical tabletop wargames. The monthly magazine has both paper and digital editions and maintains editorial, design and administrative staff in Nottingham, England.

The magazine reviews new products, provides painting advice, produces campaign settings, and researches historical battles. It is in a large part based on submission of content from wargaming enthusiasts around the world. 

Wargames Illustrated was conceived and originally owned and edited by Duncan Macfarlane (ex-Games Workshop manager). In January 2009 Macfarlane sold the magazine to Battlefront Miniatures of New Zealand. Battlefront employed Dan Faulconbridge as the UK Editor and Dave Taylor as the US Editor. In May 2015 Battlefront Miniatures sold Wargames Illustrated Limited to UK Editor Dan Faulconbridge, who since then has been the sole owner and editor.

References

Hard Talk? Interview with Dan Faulconbridge UK Editor of Wargames Illustrated, July 2013

External links
 

Magazines established in 1987
Wargaming magazines
Monthly magazines published in the United Kingdom
Mass media in Nottinghamshire